The Rev. Canon Kenneth Julian Faithfull Bickersteth,  (5 July 1885 – 16 October 1962) was an English Anglican priest, military chaplain, and headmaster from the prominent Bickersteth family. He served as Archdeacon of Maidstone from 1942–58. In 1953, he was appointed Honorary Chaplain to the Queen.

Early life and education
Bickersteth was born in 1885 in Ripon, Yorkshire, England, into a prominent ecclesiastical family. He was one of six sons born to The Rev. Canon Samuel Bickersteth (1857–1937) and Ella Chlora Faithfull Monier-Williams (1858–1954). His mother was the daughter of academic Sir Monier Monier-Williams, and she was "one of the five or six little girls in Oxford on whom Lewis Carroll modelled his Alice in Wonderland". His nephew is Bishop John Bickersteth.

Bickersteth was educated at Rugby School, then an all-boys public school in Rugby, Warwickshire. He studied mathematics at Christ Church, Oxford. He graduated from the University of Oxford in 1907 with a Bachelor of Arts (BA) degree; as per tradition, his BA was promoted to a Master of Arts (MA Oxon).

After completing his undergraduate degree, Bickersteth spent a year teaching English in the British Raj. He decided to enter the clergy and returned to England. He then entered Wells Theological College, an Anglican theological college to train for ordained ministry. As a graduate, he only need to spend one-year training before ordination.

Career

Bickersteth was ordained in the Church of England as a deacon in 1909 and as a priest in 1910. From 1909 to 1912, he served his curacy at St Andrew's Church, Rugby, which was then in the Diocese of Worcester. In 1912, he first moved to Australia where he had been appointed the chaplain to Melbourne Church of England Grammar School, an independent boarding school in Melbourne.

In 1915, one year after the start of the First World War, Bickersteth returned to England with the intention of becoming a military chaplain.

Between the wars, he was headmaster of The Collegiate School of St Peter in Adelaide, Australia, and then headmaster of Felsted School in Essex, England. From 1942 to 1958, he served as Archdeacon of Maidstone in the Diocese of Canterbury, Church of England.

He died at Kent and Canterbury Hospital in 1962.

Honours
On 9 June 1917, Bickersteth was mentioned in despatches by Field Marshal Sir Douglas Haig. On 1 January 1918, he was awarded the Military Cross (MC) "for distinguished service in the Field". Though he was immediately given the ribbon to wear on his uniform, he had to wait till 1919 to receive the medal itself. That year, during a ceremony at Buckingham Palace, he stood side by side with one of his brothers as they were both awarded the Military Cross by George V.

On 3 November 1953, Bickersteth was appointed an Honorary Chaplain to the Queen (QHC).

References

1885 births
1962 deaths
Military personnel from Yorkshire
20th-century English Anglican priests
Australian headmasters
Royal Army Chaplains' Department officers
People from Ripon
People educated at Rugby School
Alumni of Wells Theological College
Recipients of the Military Cross
Honorary Chaplains to the Queen
British Army personnel of World War I
World War I chaplains
Heads of schools in England
Schoolteachers from Essex
Julian